Matthew Hutton (3 January 1693 – 18 March 1758) was a high churchman in the Church of England, serving as Archbishop of York (1747–1757) and Archbishop of Canterbury (1757–1758).

Early life and education
Hutton was born at Marske near Richmond in Yorkshire, the second son of John Hutton of Marske (great-great-grandson of Matthew Hutton, Archbishop of York 1595–1606) and his wife Dorothy, daughter of William Dyke.

He was educated at Ripon Grammar School and Jesus College, Cambridge, matriculating in 1710, graduating B.A. 1714, M.A. 1717. He was a fellow of Christ's College, Cambridge, from 1717 to 1727, and graduated D.D. (comitia regia) in 1728.

At Cambridge he was an exact contemporary of Thomas Herring, whom he succeeded in each of his three bishoprics.

Ordained ministry
Hutton became a royal chaplain to George II in 1736. In 1737 he was appointed Canon of the second stall at St George's Chapel, Windsor Castle, a position he held until 1739. He became Rector of Trowbridge and of Spofforth, in Yorkshire, and held prebends at York and Westminster.

Episcopal ministry
In 1743 he became Bishop of Bangor, and in 1747, Archbishop of York, before finally, in 1757, becoming Archbishop of Canterbury, but died the next year without having ever lived in Lambeth Palace.

Suspected discovery of his coffin

In 2016, during the refurbishment of the Garden Museum, which is housed at the medieval church of St Mary-at-Lambeth, 30 lead coffins were found; one with an archbishop's red and gold mitre on top of it. Two archbishops were identified from nameplates on their coffins; with church records revealing that a further three archbishops, including Hutton, were likely to be buried in the vault.

References

1693 births
1758 deaths
Alumni of Jesus College, Cambridge
Archbishops of Canterbury
Archbishops of York
18th-century Anglican archbishops
Bishops of Bangor
Doctors of Divinity
Fellows of Christ's College, Cambridge
Members of the Privy Council of Great Britain
People educated at Ripon Grammar School
Canons of Westminster
People from Richmondshire (district)
People from Ravensworth
Burials at St Mary-at-Lambeth
Canons of Windsor
18th-century Welsh Anglican bishops